Claude Davis (born June 14, 1989) is an American football linebacker for the Sioux City Bandits of Champions Indoor Football (CIF). He was signed by the New York Jets as an undrafted free agent in 2013. He played college football at the University of South Florida.

Early years
Davis attended Lake Gibson High School in Florida. He earned first-team all-state honors in his senior season at Lake Gibson High School. He also played in the North vs. South All-Star Game.

College career

East Mississippi Community College
He attended East Mississippi Community College where he spend his freshman and sophomore seasons. He was named to the 2009 Mississippi Association of Community & Junior Colleges All-North State First-team. He also was selected to the 2009 NJCAA Preseason All-American First-team. He was selected to the 2008 MACJC All-North State Second-team in his freshman season.

University of South Florida
Davis spent his junior and senior seasons at the University of South Florida. In his Senior season, he had 16 tackles, 6 sacks, 2 Forced fumbles and one pass deflection.

Professional career

New York Jets
Davis was signed by the New York Jets on January 2, 2013 to a reserve/future contract. He was waived on April 30, 2013 after being arrested and charged with possession of marijuana.

Tampa Bay Storm
Davis was assigned to the Tampa Bay Storm of the Arena Football League on May 30, 2013. Davis was reassigned on June 7, 2013. Davis was again assigned by the Storm on June 20, 2013. Davis was reassigned by the Storm on July 2, 2013.

Nebraska Danger
Davis signed with the Nebraska Danger of the Indoor Football League for 2015. He was released on March 2, 2015.

Billings Wolves
Davis signed with the Billings Wolves on March 3, 2015.

Sioux Falls Storm
Just two days after signing with the Wolves, Davis was traded to the Sioux Falls Storm for future considerations. Following the 2016 season, Davis was named a Second-team All-IFL selection. Davis repeated as a Second-team All-IFL selection in 2017. On October 16, 2017, Davis re-signed with the Storm.

Sioux City Bandits
In March 2020, Davis was to be traded to the San Diego Strike Force, another Indoor Football League team.  Unhappy with this, Davis left the Sioux Falls Storm and accepted a position with the Sioux City Bandits a Champions Indoor Football (CIF) team.

References

External links
 South Florida profile
 New York Jets profile

1989 births
Living people
American football linebackers
Billings Wolves players
East Mississippi Lions football players
Nebraska Danger players
New York Jets players
South Florida Bulls football players
Tampa Bay Storm players
Sioux Falls Storm players
Sportspeople from Lakeland, Florida
Players of American football from Florida
Sioux City Bandits players